Aphrodita aculeata, the sea mouse, is a marine polychaete worm found in the North Atlantic, the North Sea, the Baltic Sea and the Mediterranean. The sea mouse normally lies buried head-first in the sand.

Etymology

The name of the genus is taken from Aphrodite, the Ancient Greek goddess of love, said to be because of a supposed resemblance to human female genitalia.  The English name may derive from the  resemblance to a bedraggled house mouse when washed up on shore. The specific name aculeata is the Latin for spiny.

Description
The body of the sea mouse is covered in a dense mat of setae (hairlike structures).

Structural coloration

The spines, or setae, on the scaled back of the sea mouse are one of its unique features. Normally, these have a deep red sheen, warning off predators, but when the light shines on them perpendicularly, they flush green and blue, a "remarkable example of photonic engineering by a living organism". This structural coloration is a defense mechanism, giving a warning signal to potential predators. The effect is produced by many hexagonal cylinders within the spines, which "perform much more efficiently than man-made optical fibres".

Feeding
The sea mouse is an active predator feeding primarily on small crabs, hermit crabs and other polychaete worms including Pectinaria and Lumbriconereis. It has been observed consuming other polychaete worms over three times its own body length. Feeding activity takes place at night, with the animal partially buried in sand.

References

External links
 MarLIN: Sea mouse
 BIOTIC Species Information for Aphrodita aculeata

Phyllodocida
Animals described in 1758